In mathematical analysis, Rademacher's theorem, named after Hans Rademacher, states the following: If  is an open subset of  and  is Lipschitz continuous, then  is differentiable almost everywhere in ; that is, the points in  at which  is not differentiable form a set of Lebesgue measure zero. Differentiability here refers to infinitesimal approximability by a linear map, which in particular asserts the existence of the coordinate-wise partial derivatives.

Sketch of proof
The one-dimensional case of Rademacher's theorem is a standard result in introductory texts on measure-theoretic analysis. In this context, it is natural to prove the more general statement that any single-variable function of bounded variation is differentiable almost everywhere. (This one-dimensional generalization of Rademacher's theorem fails to extend to higher dimensions.)

One of the standard proofs of the general Rademacher theorem was found by Charles Morrey. The first step of the proof is to show that, for any fixed unit vector , the -directional derivative of  exists almost everywhere. This is a consequence of a special case of the Fubini theorem: a measurable set in  has Lebesgue measure zero if its restriction to every line parallel to  has (one-dimensional) Lebesgue measure zero. Considering in particular the set in  where the -directional derivative of  fails to exist (which must be proved to be measurable), the latter condition is met due to the one-dimensional case of Rademacher's theorem.

The second step of Morrey's proof establishes the linear dependence of the -directional derivative of  upon . This is based upon the following identity:

Then, based upon the known linear dependence of the -directional derivative of  upon , the same can be proved of  via the fundamental lemma of calculus of variations.

At this point in the proof, the existence of the gradient (defined as the -tuple of partial derivatives) is guaranteed to exist almost everywhere; for each , the dot product with  equals the -directional derivative almost everywhere (although perhaps on a smaller set).

Morrey's proof can also be put into the context of generalized derivatives. Another proof, also via a reduction to the one-dimensional case, uses the technology of approximate limits.

Applications
Rademacher's theorem can be used to prove that, for any , the Sobolev space  is preserved under a bi-Lipschitz transformation of the domain, with the chain rule holding in its standard form. With appropriate modification, this also extends to the more general Sobolev spaces .

Rademacher's theorem is also significant in the study of geometric measure theory and rectifiable sets, as it allows the analysis of first-order differential geometry, specifically tangent planes and normal vectors. Higher-order concepts such as curvature remain more subtle, since their usual definitions require more differentiability than is achieved by the Rademacher theorem. In the presence of convexity, second-order differentiability is achieved by the Alexandrov theorem, the proof of which can be modeled on that of the Rademacher theorem. In some special cases, the Rademacher theorem is even used as part of the proof.

Generalizations
Alberto Calderón proved the more general fact that if  is an open bounded set in  then every function in the Sobolev space  is differentiable almost everywhere, provided that . Calderón's theorem is a relatively direct corollary of the Lebesgue differentiation theorem and Sobolev embedding theorem.

There is a version of Rademacher's theorem that holds for Lipschitz functions from a Euclidean space into an arbitrary metric space in terms of metric differentials instead of the usual derivative.

See also
Pansu derivative

References 

Sources

External links
 (Rademacher's theorem with a proof is on page 18 and further.)

Lipschitz maps
Theorems in measure theory